The Togian (or Togean) Islands are an archipelago of 56 islands and many offshore islets,  situated in the Gulf of Tomini, off the coast of Central Sulawesi, in Indonesia. The largest islands are Batudaka, Togean, Talatako and Una-Una. There are 59 villages on the islands, with one settled by the Bajau people, more commonly known as the sea gypsies.

Administration
The islands are a part of the Tojo Una-Una Regency within Central Sulawesi Province. At the time of the 2010 Census, the Archipelago was divided into four districts (kecamatan). Subsequent to 2010, two additional districts have been created - Batudaka and Talatako. These are tabulated below with their areas and their 2010 and 2020 Census populations, together with the official estimate as at mid 2021.  The table also includes the locations of the district administrative centres, the number of villages (rural desa and urban kelurahan) in each district, and its post code.

Notes: (a) The 2010 Census population of Batudaka district is included in the figure for Una-Una district, from which it was cut out.(b) The 2010 Census population of Talatako district is included in the figure for Walea Kepulauan district, from which it was cut out.

Geology and ecology
Formed by volcanic activity, the islands are covered by  rainforest and surrounded by  coral reef formations, which provide habitat and breeding areas for hawksbill turtle, green turtle and the dugong. The Tonkean macaque is found in the islands' forests. The animals endemic to the islands include the Togian babirusa and the Togian hawk-owl, which is discovered in 1999.  The Togian white-eye, another endemic bird species, was described in 2008. Non-venomous jellyfish are also found in Togian Islands, the unique one is jellyfish with little red spots.

National Park
On 2004, the government established a part of Togean Islands as a National Park consists of 292,000 hectares of sea water (includes 132,000 hectares of coral reef which is the largest in Indonesia), 70,000 hectares of land and 10,659 hectares reservation of forests and mangroves.

Access 
Access to the Togean Islands is primarily facilitated through air and sea transportation. Travelers can fly to nearby airports such as Palu (PLW), Gorontalo (GTO), or Luwuk (LUW), before continuing their journey by land to the coastal towns of Ampana or Gorontalo. From these towns, visitors can take public ferries, speedboats, or chartered boats to the islands. Ferry services from Gorontalo to Wakai operate twice a week, while speedboats and chartered boats from Ampana offer more flexible schedules. Travel times vary based on the specific island destination and mode of transport, with speedboats providing the fastest option. It is advisable to consult with local resorts and tourism operators for the most up-to-date information on schedules and transportation options when planning a trip to the Togean Islands.

See also

Kepulauan Togean National Park

References

External links
Togean Islands website for a general source of informations about the Togean Islands

Informative and rare trip report

Archipelagoes of Indonesia
Islands of Sulawesi
Landforms of Central Sulawesi
Populated places in Indonesia